In theoretical physics, the Dirac–Kähler equation, also known as the Ivanenko–Landau–Kähler equation, is the geometric analogue of the Dirac equation that can be defined on any pseudo-Riemannian manifold using the Laplace–de Rham operator. In four-dimensional flat spacetime, it is equivalent to four copies of the Dirac equation that transform into each other under Lorentz transformations, although this is no longer true in curved spacetime. The geometric structure gives the equation a natural discretization that is equivalent to the staggered fermion formalism in lattice field theory, making Dirac–Kähler fermions the formal continuum limit of staggered fermions. The equation was discovered by Dmitri Ivanenko and Lev Landau in 1928 and later rediscovered by Erich Kähler in 1962.

Mathematical overview 

In four dimensional Euclidean spacetime a generic fields of differential forms

Each index runs from one to four. Here  are antisymmetric tensor fields while  are the corresponding differential form basis elements

Using the Hodge star operator , the exterior derivative  is related to the codifferential through . These form the Laplace–de Rham operator  which can be viewed as the square root of the Laplacian operator since . The Dirac–Kähler equation equation is motivated by noting that this is also the property of the Dirac operator, yielding

This equation is closely related to the usual Dirac equation, a connection which emerges from the close relation between the exterior algebra of differential forms and the Clifford algebra of which Dirac spinors are irreducible representations. For the basis elements to satisfy the Clifford algebra , it is required to introduce a new Clifford product  acting on basis elements as

Using this product, the action of the Laplace–de Rham operator on differential form basis elements is written as

To acquire the Dirac equation, a change of basis must be performed, where the new basis can be packaged into a matrix  defined using the Dirac matrices

The matrix  is designed to satisfy , decomposing the Clifford algebra into four irreducible copies of the Dirac algebra. Writing the differential form in this basis

transforms the Dirac–Kähler equation into four sets of the Dirac equation indexed by 

The minimally coupled Dirac–Kähler equation is found by replacing the derivative with the covariant derivative  leading to

As before, this is also equivalent to four copies of the Dirac equation. In the abelian case , while in the non-abelian case there are additional color indices. The Dirac–Kähler fermion  also picks up color indices, with it formally corresponding to cross-sections of the Whitney product of the Atiyah–Kähler bundle of differential forms with the vector bundle of local color spaces.

Discretization 

There is a natural way in which to discretize the Dirac–Kähler equation using the correspondence between exterior algebra and simplicial complexes. Then a h-chain is a formal linear combination

The h-chains admit a boundary operator  defined as the (h-1)-simplex forming the boundary of the h-chain. A coboundary operator  can be similarly defined to yield a (h+1)-chain. The dual space of chains consists of -cochains , which are linear functions acting on the h-chains mapping them to real numbers. The boundary and coboundary operators admit similar structures in dual space called the dual boundary  and dual coboundary  defined to satisfy

Under the correspondence between the exterior algebra and simplicial complexes, differential forms are equivalent to cochains, while the exterior derivative and codifferential correspond to the dual boundary and dual coboundary, respectively. Therefore, the Dirac–Kähler equation is written on simplicial complexes as

The resulting discretized Dirac–Kähler fermion  is equivalent to the staggered fermion found in lattice field theory, which can be seen explicitly by an explicit change of basis. This equivalence shows that the continuum Dirac–Kähler fermion is the formal continuum limit of fermion staggered fermions.

Relation to the Dirac equation 

As described previously, the Dirac–Kähler equation in flat spacetime is equivalent to four copies of the Dirac equation, despite being a set of equations for antisymmetric tensor fields. The ability of integer spin tensor fields to describe half integer spinor fields is explained by the fact that Lorentz transformations do not commute with the internal Dirac–Kähler  symmetry, with the parameters of this symmetry being tensors rather than scalars. This means that the Lorentz transformations mix different spins together and the Dirac fermions are not strictly speaking half-integer spin representations of the Clifford algebra. They instead correspond to a coherent superposition of differential forms. In higher dimensions, particularly on  dimensional surfaces, the Dirac–Kähler equation is equivalent to  Dirac equations.

In curved spacetime, the Dirac–Kähler equation no longer decomposes into four Dirac equations. Rather it is a modified Dirac equation acquired if the Dirac operator remained the square root of the Laplace operator, a property not shared by the Dirac equation in curved spacetime. This comes at the expense of Lorentz invariance, although these effects are suppressed by powers of the Planck mass. The equation also differs in that its zero modes on a compact manifold are always guaranteed to exist whenever some of the Betti numbers vanish, being given by the harmonic forms, unlike for the Dirac equation which never has zero modes on a manifold with positive curvature.

See also 
 Fermion doubling
 Lattice QCD

References 

Theoretical physics
Dirac equation
Lattice field theory
Lev Landau